This article lists some of the events that took place in the Netherlands in 2001.

Incumbents
Monarch: Beatrix
Prime Minister: Wim Kok

Events
1 January – Fire at a New Years party in a bar in Volendam kills 14 young people and injures 200
18 January – Fire at Schiphol airport leads to chaos
26 January – Suspect of fireworks explosion in Enschede in May 2000 arrested
6 February – Foreign minister Van Aartsen calls off visit to the People's Republic of China because of human rights
8 February – Eight Hells Angels are arrested in their club house in Amsterdam
14 February – Government Information Service declares that Queen Beatrix's second son Friso is not homosexual
14 February – The creator of the Anna Kournikova computer virus turns himself in
21 March – First case of foot and mouth disease discovered
30 March – Engagement of Crown Prince Willem Alexander and Máxima Zorreguieta announced

Arts and literature
26 March – Michael Dudok de Wit wins an Academy Award (Short film/animated) for Father and Daughter

Sports
11 February – Rintje Ritsma wins the world all-round speed skating title.
21 April – FC Den Bosch wins the Eerste Divisie.
28 April – Erik Dekker wins the Amstel Gold Race.
6 May – PSV Eindhoven secures the Dutch football title in the Eredivisie by beating SC Heerenveen 3–0.
24 May – FC Twente wins the KNVB Cup after beating PSV Eindhoven in the penalty shootout
16 June – HC Den Bosch clinches the Dutch men's field hockey title by beating Oranje Zwart of Eindhoven in the play-offs.
23 June – The women of HC Den Bosch clinch the Dutch women's field hockey title by beating HC Rotterdam in the play-offs.
26 August – The women of Argentina beat the Netherlands to win the Champions Trophy, held at the Wagener stadium in Amstelveen.
21 October – Driss El Himer wins the Amsterdam Marathon

Births
7 February – Cheick Touré, Soccer player
15 April – Anna van Lippe-Biesterfeld van Vollenhoven, daughter of Prince Maurits and Princess Marilène
19 November – Aidan Mikdad, Pianist

Deaths

January

 8 – Johan van der Keuken (1938), documentary film-maker

March

 1 – Hannie Termeulen Swimmer
 12 – Victor Westhoff Botanist
 21 – Wim van der Kroft Canoeist

April

 4 – Wim van der Linden
 18 – Hans Dirk de Vries Reilingh Geographer
 20 – Steven Blaisse Rower 
 29 – Barend Biesheuvel 44th Prime Minister of the Netherlands

May

 27 – Bram van Leeuwen Entrepreneur

June

 11 – Cornelis Verhoeven Philosopher and Writer
 27 – Kees Stip Poet

July

 9 – Arie van Vliet Cyclist
 11 – Herman Brood Musician 
 12 – Ron Kroon Swimmer
 27 – Piet Bromberg Field hockey player
 31 – Joris Tjebbes Swimmer

August

 4 – Jan van der Jagt Politician 
 6 – Wina Born Culinary journalist 
 8 – Noud van Melis Soccer player 
 20 – Sylvia Millecam Actress and comedian
 23 – Herman Fokker Politician 
 28 – Theo Blankenauw Cyclist

September

 7 – Jan Baas Baseball player

October

 5 – Egbert van 't Oever Speed skater and Coach
 22 – Ed Vijent Soccer player 
 28 – Gerard Hengeveld Pianist and Composer

November

 29 – Jan van Beekum Composer

December

 1 – Stan Haag Radio host 
 2 – Max Rood Politician 
 14 – Elisabeth Augustin Writer and Poet 
 19 – Hans Warren Poet
 23 – Jelle Zijlstra 42nd Prime Minister of the Netherlands

See also
2001 in Dutch television

References

 
Netherlands
Years of the 21st century in the Netherlands
2000s in the Netherlands
Netherlands